The 10-20mm F4-5.6 EX DC HSM is an enthusiast-level, ultra wide-angle rectilinear zoom lens made by Sigma Corporation specifically for use with small format digital SLRs.

See also
List of Nikon F-mount lenses with integrated autofocus motors

References

010-020mm F4-5.6 EX DC HSM